The Chulec Formation (Ki-chu) is a geological formation in Peru whose strata date back to the Albian. Pterosaur remains and ammonites are among the fossils that have been recovered from the formation.

See also 
 List of pterosaur-bearing stratigraphic units

References

Bibliography 
 

Geologic formations of Peru
Lower Cretaceous Series of South America
Cretaceous Peru
Albian Stage
Limestone formations
Marl formations
Shale formations
Paleontology in Peru
Geography of Cajamarca Region
Geography of Huánuco Region